Olendry may refer to several places:
Olendry, Greater Poland Voivodeship (west-central Poland)
Olendry, Łódź Voivodeship (central Poland)
Olendry, Podlaskie Voivodeship (north-east Poland)
 Lipicze Olendry
 Smardowskie Olendry